MasterChef France is a French television series broadcast on TF1 in France. It premiered on August 19, 2010. It is produced by Shine France and TF1 and has run for four seasons. The original presenter, Carole Rousseau, was controversially removed from the programme in 2013.

Michel Roux Jr, a judge in the original British series, has stated that he believes the British MasterChef should be more ambitious and emulate some of the content of the French version.

Plot
A large number of amateur chefs compete in the MasterChef France kitchen to impress three judges in order to become the MasterChef France winner.

Seasons

Season 1 (2010)
The first season ran from August 19 to November 4, 2010.

Contestants

Season 2 (2011)
The second season ran from August 18 to November 3, 2011.

Season 3 (2012)
The third season ran from August 23 to November 8, 2012.

Season 4 (2013)
The fourth season ran from September 20 to December 20, 2013.

Season 5 (2015)
The fifth season ran from June 25 to September 3, 2015.

Season 6 (2022)
The sixth season ran on France 2 from August 23, 2022.

See also
 List of French Adaptations of Television Series from Other Countries

References

France
TF1 original programming
2010 French television series debuts
Cooking television series
Cooking competitions in France
French television series based on British television series
French reality television series